Kasa is a medium-small village located in Örnsköldsvik Municipality in northern Sweden.

Populated places in Örnsköldsvik Municipality
Ångermanland